Mylesinus is a genus of serrasalmids from South America, where found in the eastern Amazon, Essequibo and Orinoco basins. They are rheophilic, typically found at rapids and mainly feed on Podostemaceae plants. Because of their habitat preference, they are threatened by the building of dams.

Species
There are three recognized species:

 Mylesinus paraschomburgkii Jégu, dos Santos & E. J. G. Ferreira, 1989
 Mylesinus paucisquamatus Jégu & dos Santos, 1988
 Mylesinus schomburgkii Valenciennes, 1850

References

Serrasalmidae
Taxa named by Achille Valenciennes
Fish of South America